Le Fil qui chante is a Lucky Luke adventure written by Goscinny and illustrated by Morris. It is the forty sixth book in the series and was originally published in French in 1977 by Dargaud and in English by Cinebook in 2012. The story is based on the historical feat of constructing the First Transcontinental Telegraph line connecting the West Coast of the United States and the East Coast of the United States in 1861. The title in English is The Singing Wire, referring both to "singing" of wires (caused by vortex shedding), and the transmission of communication (later voice) across electric cables.

Synopsis 
One hundred thousand dollars will be offered to the city which will build the telegraph line to Salt Lake City the quickest. Carson City in the west and Omaha in the east are up to the challenge. But the sabotage of the opposing team and the attacks of Indians will somewhat slow down the pioneers of the singing wire, of which Lucky Luke is a part, having resigned from the Pony Express to join the team.

Characters 

 James Gamble: Optimistic engineer responsible for carrying out the telegraph between Carson City and Salt Lake City
 Edward Creighton: Friend and rival of Gamble, head of the Omaha team
 Bradwell: Dishonest leader of the Omaha team who intends to pocket the promised bonus for the one who arrives first in Salt Lake City, and a caricature of American actor Brian Donlevy.
 Pots: Cook from the Gamble team, accused of being a traitor
 Sparrowhawk: Indian hired by Gamble to persuade the Indian tribes allow the telegraph on their land

History 

 Buffalo Bill appears in a panel at the start of the story.
 The President of the United States Abraham Lincoln appeared at the beginning of the album.
 The president of the Western Union, Hiram Sibley, appears at the beginning of the album.
 James Gamble and Edward Creighton were the two engineers responsible for the ultimate telegraph junction.
 Washakie, chief of the Shoshone tribe, was real. He initially opposed the installation of the telegraph before being favorable to it.
 Brigham Young appears at the end of the comic book album.
 The president of the court of California, Stephen J. Field, appears at the end of the story. The telegram which he sends to Abraham Lincoln is, moreover, authentic.

Adaptation 
This album was adapted from the animated series Lucky Luke, released for the first time in 1984.

External links
Lucky Luke official site album index 
Goscinny website on Lucky Luke 

Comics by Morris (cartoonist)
Fiction set in 1861
Lucky Luke albums
1977 graphic novels
Works by René Goscinny
Cultural depictions of Abraham Lincoln
Cultural depictions of Buffalo Bill